Darevskia chlorogaster, the greenbelly lizard, is a lizard species in the genus Darevskia. It is found in Azerbaijan and Iran.

References

Darevskia
Reptiles described in 1908
Taxa named by George Albert Boulenger